The Arita Porcelain Park is a small theme park located in Arita town, Saga Prefecture, Japan. The Porcelain Park is a recreation of a traditional German village, and is located just on the outskirts of Arita on the road to Hasami. Most stunning is the reproduction of the “Zwinger,” a famous palace in the German city of Dresden. Inside the palace are impressive permanent exhibition of both European porcelain in one wing and Arita-yaki in the other. Behind the palace lies a European style garden. There is also a large ancient kiln which can be visited. The theme park also houses various stores selling both traditional Japanese and European-style products.

External links 
Arita Porcelain Park's official website: https://www.arita-touki.com/
Arita On-Line:  https://web.archive.org/web/20070404062333/http://www.arita.or.jp/index_e.html%3Cbr />
ANA's Destination Guide:  web link

Amusement parks in Japan
Buildings and structures in Saga Prefecture
Ceramics museums in Japan
Tourist attractions in Saga Prefecture